

The Sandy Hook Lighthouse, located about one and a half statute miles (2.4 km) inland from the tip of Sandy Hook, New Jersey, is the oldest working lighthouse in the United States. It was designed and built on June 11, 1764 by Isaac Conro. It was listed as a National Historic Landmark in 1964 and added to the National Register of Historic Places on October 15, 1966, for its significance in commerce and transportation.

History
The light was built to aid mariners entering the southern end of the New York Harbor. It was originally called New York Lighthouse because it was funded through a New York Assembly lottery and a tax on all ships entering the Port of New York. The lighthouse has endured an attempt to destroy it as an aid to British navigation by Benjamin Tupper, and a subsequent occupancy of British soldiers during the Revolutionary War.

Almost two years after the State of New York ratified the U.S. Constitution, the lighthouse was transferred to federal authority. George Washington wrote to the Senate on April 5, 1790, "I have directed my private secretary to lay before you copies of three acts of the legislature of New York ... An act for vesting in the United States of America the light-house and the lands thereunto belonging at Sandy Hook".  The lighthouse is located on the grounds of Fort Hancock.

In 1990, the U.S. Postal Service issued a 25 cent stamp featuring the Sandy Hook Lighthouse.

Today

Sandy Hook Lighthouse, which was restored in spring 2000, is part of the Sandy Hook Unit of Gateway National Recreation Area administered by the National Park Service. Seven days a week, National Park Service Park Rangers offer free tours every half hour from 1:00 p.m. until 4:30 p.m. The view from the top includes the Atlantic Ocean, Sandy Hook Bay and the New York City skyline.

In popular culture
On September 18, 2009 the Sandy Hook Light was filmed as a fictional backdrop for final episode of the longest running soap opera Guiding Light.

See also
List of National Historic Landmarks in New Jersey
List of the oldest buildings in New Jersey
Geography of New York-New Jersey Harbor Estuary
Raritan Bayshore

Notes

External links
 
 
Sandy Hook Lighthouse at American Byways
New Jersey Lighthouse Society Home Page: Sandy Hook Lighthouse
Sandy Hook Lighthouse from Lighthousefriends.com

Lighthouses completed in 1764
Lighthouses on the National Register of Historic Places in New Jersey
National Historic Landmarks in New Jersey
National Historic Landmark lighthouses
Sandy Hook, New Jersey
Gateway National Recreation Area
Middletown Township, New Jersey
National Register of Historic Places in Monmouth County, New Jersey
1764 establishments in New Jersey
New Jersey Register of Historic Places
Transportation buildings and structures in Monmouth County, New Jersey
Historic American Buildings Survey in New Jersey